The Faculty of Computing, Engineering and the Built Environment (CEBE, formerly the 
Faculty of Technology, Engineering and the Environment or TEE) is the technology department of Birmingham City University, England, covering engineering programmes. It is located in the City Centre campus in the eastern half of the Millennium Point complex. Spanning five stories of the £114 million complex in the developing Eastside district, the centre offers courses in undergraduate and postgraduate education.

History
From September 2000, the Faculty of CEBE was previously known as the Technology Innovation Centre, but during 2008, the faculty began the process of rebranding and was temporarily known as Technology Innovation and Development until autumn 2009 when TIC was renamed to the Faculty of Technology, Engineering and the Environment. The faculty now includes the Department of Computing which has combined with TIC's departments of software, networks, telecommunications and electronics; and the School of Property, Construction and Planning, forming four schools including School of Computing, Telecommunications and Networks (CTN); School of Digital Media Technology; School of Engineering, Design and Manufacturing Systems (EDMS); and School of Property, Construction and Planning. The rebranding coincides with the development of a new campus in the city's Eastside regeneration scheme. In 2014, the faculty was again rebranded to be the Faculty of CEBE.

School of Computing, Telecommunications and Networks (CTN)
The School of Computing, Telecommunications and Networks (CTN) runs academic subject disciplines such as electronics, embedded systems, telecommunications, networks, software engineering and games technology. It has developed both vocational and non-vocational learning, with blended distance teaching and learning approaches. The School includes a Centre for Software Engineering and a Centre for Cyber Security.

School of Digital Media Technology (DMT)
The School of Digital Media Technology (DMT) is one of 19 universities nationally, and the only one in the Midlands to have been granted Media Academy status. This accreditation is awarded by Skillset, the industry body that supports skills and training for the creative media industries by developing media education in the UK.

School of Engineering, Design and Manufacturing Systems (EDMS)
The School of Engineering, Design and Manufacturing Systems (EDMS) offers courses in engineering and related disciplines. There is a choice of 12 undergraduate and postgraduates courses ranging from BSc Motor Sports Technology to BEng Mechanical engineering and from MSc Automotive Calibration and Control to MSc Supply Chain Management.

The school has academic and research links with business and industry, such as Morgan Motors, and works with international technology and engineering solution partners such as PTC and Technosoft, providers of industry standard computer aided engineering (CAE) tools.

The Birmingham School of the Built Environment
The Birmingham School of the Built Environment, known as the school of Property, Construction and Planning prior to 2011, offers accredited courses at undergraduate and postgraduate level in surveying, construction, property, architectural technology and planning.

The Division of Housing, part of the School of Social Sciences, has been delivering professional housing programmes for nearly 20 years and is a major regional provider of housing education in the Midlands, offering accredited courses at both undergraduate and postgraduate level. Courses are accredited by either the Chartered Institute of Housing or the Environmental Health Registration Board.

References

External links
 

2014 establishments in England
Educational institutions established in 2014
Faculty of Computing, Engineering and the Built Environment
Computer science departments in the United Kingdom
Engineering universities and colleges in the United Kingdom
Town and country planning in England